{{DISPLAYTITLE:C18H24ClNO3}}
The molecular formula C18H24ClNO3 (molar mass: 337.84 g/mol, exact mass: 337.1445 u) may refer to:

 Ericolol
 SN 35210